Akale Aakaasham (മലയാളം:അകലെ ആകാശം) is a 1977 Indian Malayalam film,  directed by I. V. Sasi and produced by Thiruppathi Chettiyar. The film stars Madhu, Vidhubala, M. G. Soman, Adoor Bhasi, Sridevi and Sreelatha Namboothiri in the lead roles. The film has musical score by G. Devarajan.

Cast

Madhu
Vidhubala
Adoor Bhasi
Sridevi
Sreelatha Namboothiri
Bahadoor
M. G. Soman
Meena
Nanditha Bose
Padmapriya

Soundtrack
The music was composed by G. Devarajan and the lyrics were written by Sreekumaran Thampi.

References

External links
 

1977 films
1970s Malayalam-language films
Films directed by I. V. Sasi